Cainochoerus was an extinct genus of even-toed ungulates which lived during the Miocene and Pliocene in Africa. Fossils have been found in Kenya, Ethiopia and South Africa.

Cainochoerus was a very small, cursorial pig. It was originally described as a species of peccary based on its simple single-cusped premolars. Among the living pigs, the small pygmy hog can be considered an analogue.

References

Miocene even-toed ungulates
Fossil taxa described in 1988
Pliocene even-toed ungulates
Prehistoric even-toed ungulate genera
Miocene mammals of Africa
Pliocene mammals of Africa
Prehistoric Suidae